Quapaw is a town in Ottawa County, Oklahoma, United States. The population was 906 at the 2010 census, a 7.9 percent decline from the figure of 984 recorded in 2000. Quapaw is part of the Joplin, Missouri metropolitan area.

History

In 1891 Kansas farmer Isaac Bingham moved his family south into Ottawa County, then part of land assigned to the Quapaw Nation. It became part of the state of Oklahoma in 1907 after admission. 

The family founded a community and opened several businesses.  Quapaw Chief John Quapaw donated land for a community school. The Kansas City, Fort Scott and Memphis Railroad established a railroad stop and siding at this site. This established access to markets for hay and agricultural products of the area, attracting more settlers. A post office was opened in the community grocery store in 1897.

The community leaders platted "New Town Quapaw" on land to the east that was purchased from Harry Whitebird (Quapaw). This "new" town was incorporated in 1917 as Quapaw. Discovery of lead and zinc ores in the area resulted in this area being developed as part of the Tri-State mining district. As thousands of miners moved into the larger area, there was a population boom. 

Native Americans were generally excluded from mining jobs, although the county had a significant population from several federally recognized tribes, such as the Quapaw. The population and economic boom stimulated development of new businesses. The 1920 census for the town listed 1,394 residents. In the 1920s U. S. Route 66 was developed through Quapaw and was paved through Ottawa County by 1933. This event was celebrated with Quapaw Chief Victor Griffin laying a zinc tablet in the center of Main Street.

As the local mining operations began to decline before World War II, jobs left the region and the population declined to 1,054 by 1940, and to 850 by 1960. The region was left with widespread mine tailings, known as chat, and extensive environmental toxic hazards. 

The town of Quapaw voted for Charles Daniels as a trustee on April 6, 2021.

Geography

Demographics

As of the census of 2000, there were 984 people, 352 households, and 258 families residing in the town. There were 423 housing units at an average density of 756.3 per square mile (291.6/km2). The racial makeup of the town was 68.60% White, 22.46% Native American, 0.20% Asian, 0.10% from other races, and 8.64% from two or more races. Hispanic or Latino of any race were 1.52% of the population.

There were 352 households, out of which 31.5% had children under the age of 18 living with them, 52.8% were married couples living together, 14.2% had a female householder with no husband present, and 26.7% were non-families. 22.4% of all households were made up of individuals, and 11.6% had someone living alone who was 65 years of age or older. The average household size was 2.72 and the average family size was 3.16.

In the town, the population was spread out, with 28.7% under the age of 18, 9.7% from 18 to 24, 22.8% from 25 to 44, 22.9% from 45 to 64, and 16.1% who were 65 years of age or older. The median age was 35 years. For every 100 females, there were 97.2 males. For every 100 females age 18 and over, there were 87.2 males.

The median income for a household in the town was $24,083, and the median income for a family was $29,375. Males had a median income of $25,625 versus $17,279 for females. The per capita income for the town was $10,182. About 22.3% of families and 28.3% of the population were below the poverty line, including 41.1% of those under age 18 and 18.1% of those age 65 or over.

Education
Quapaw Public Schools operates area public schools.

In popular culture
Quapaw was mentioned in a 1976 episode of the television show M*A*S*H, a U.S. situation comedy.  In the episode "The Colonel's Horse," when Colonel Potter goes to Tokyo on R&R, his horse develops colic. Mike Farrell's character B.J. said his wife Peg (played by Catherine Bergstrom) was from Quapaw and that his father-in-law knew all about horses; they called him for advice.  Coincidentally, fellow M*A*S*H cast member Judy Farrell, Mike Farrell's real-life wife at the time, was born in Quapaw.

Quapaw is mentioned in the film Oklahoma as one of the towns in which the character Jud had worked at some point in the past.  Jud recounted a fictional case of deadly arson that occurred five years prior to the film's setting.

See also 
 Quapaw
 Quapaw Indian Agency

References

Towns in Ottawa County, Oklahoma
Towns in Oklahoma